Alfonso López III (born May 16, 1982) is an American professional boxer of Mexican descent. López fights out of Houston, Texas raised out of Cut & Shoot, Texas. He currently holds the WBC-NABF bridgerweight title in 2021-22. He has held the WBC-NABF light heavyweight title since 2019, also former WBC-Continental Americas super middleweight title in (2010) and the WBO-NABO light heavyweight title in (2019).
As of September 1, 2022, López is ranked 6th in the World in the WBC rankings.

Personal life
Alfonso López III was born May 16, 1982 in Corpus Christi, Texas to Mexican parents.

López was an all-district football player at Corpus Christi Moody High School and went on to play linebacker at Sam Houston State University before ever boxing in the amateur ranks.

López is married to Cara Marie Skero López, they reside in The Woodlands, Texas with their children.

Currently, López is the Owner of El Tigre Promotions & is serving the community with up & coming fighters in the Houston area.

Amateur career
López was a two-time Texas Golden Gloves Champion and won a silver medal at the 2005 U.S. National Championships in the Light Heavyweight division.

With a short-lived amateur career, López decided to turn pro in 2007 after his graduation from Sam Houston State University.

Professional career
In April 2010, in Corpus Christi, Texas, Alfonso won a six-round unanimous decision victory over Gabriel Holguin.

On November 4, 2010, Lopez fought for the vacant WBC Continental Americas Super Middleweight Championship in Dallas, Texas. Lopez won by TKO in Round 12 against Romaro Johnson, capturing his first world title.

On May 7, 2011, López lost to former world champion Kelly Pavlik by majority decision. This bout was on Showtime's televised portion of the Pacquiao vs. Mosley undercard.

On January 6, 2012, Lopez fought Dyah Davis (son of 1976 Olympic Gold Medalist Howard Davis Jr.) for the vacant NABF Super Middleweight title. Lopez dropped a 10-round unanimous decision to Davis.

February 28, 2013 Lopez had surgery on his left elbow and then had another surgery on March 27 for his right elbow. Lopez took time to rest and recover from the surgeries on his elbows.

"El Tigre" made his comeback on October 18, 2014, after a -year layoff to heal his injury. He won by TKO in Round 1 against Sean Rawley Wilson.

Lopez returned to the ring on the undercard of Canelo vs. Kirkland, May 9, 2015, in Houston, Texas at Minute Maid Park. El Tigre earned a 2nd-round KO victory over Cuban slugger Lester Gonzalez.

After almost 2 years off due to another injury, El Tigre returned to the ring March 24, 2017 against Colby Courter at the Humble Civic Center. The bout was stopped in round 3, giving Lopez a TKO victory.

Trying to stay active Lopez fought Rayford Johnson on June 30, 2017, who he had beaten years prior. Johnson's wanted to show Lopez that the first fight was a fluke and a bad day at the office. Lopez cruised to UD victory in an 8-round bout at the Humble Civic Center.

After a lay-off to promote his own promotional company, El Tigre Promotions. Once again the fight took place at Humble Civic Center, but this time under El Tigre Promotions. Lopez returned to fight Francisco Cordero for the vacant ABO Light Heavyweight Championship. Alfonso stopped his Colombian counterpart in round 8 to win the vacant belt.

On November 17, 2018, Lopez made his first successful defense of his ABO Light Heavyweight Championship. After sustaining a cut over his right eye, Lopez stopped Colombian Milton Núñez in the final round of their bout to retain the American Boxing Organization Light Heavyweight Championship.

On Saturday April 6, 2019, at the Galveston Island Convention Center in Galveston, Texas López defeated Melvin Russell, on his way to a TKO victory in round 5. 
With the push from Gilberto “El Zurdo” Ramírez Gilberto Ramírez to the light heavyweight division, Lopez took this time to call him out.

After signing to fight Alvin Varmall  of New York, plans fell through. Colombian Alex Theran  stepped up to challenge López for the vacant WBO NABO Light Heavyweight Championship. On July 13, 2019, at the Lone Star Convention Center in Conroe, Texas the men met in a bout. Theran refused to come out for the fifth round and the TKO victory made López the new WBO NABO Light Heavyweight Champion.

Lopez won the vacant NABF Light Heavyweight Championship against Denis Grachev  on November 16, 2019, in an easy UD.

Professional boxing record

References

External links 

American boxers of Mexican descent
Light-heavyweight boxers
Boxers from Texas
People from Corpus Christi, Texas
People from Brazoria County, Texas
1982 births
Living people
American male boxers
Bridgerweight boxers